Richard Emsley (born December 1951 in Goole, Yorkshire) is a British composer, sometimes associated with the New Complexity school.

Emsley initially studied with Arnold Whittall at University College, Cardiff, after which he moved to London, where he still lives. He attended Peter Maxwell Davies' composition classes at the Dartington Summer School of Music, and co-founded the Cardiff Composers' Ensemble while a student there. In the 1970s he co-founded, with James Clarke, the ensemble Suoraan, which specialised in performances of music by contemporary composers, including Iannis Xenakis, Michael Finnissy and James Dillon.

In 2002, Métier released a CD of Emsley's music, entitled Flowforms.

In addition to composing, Emsley works as a music engraver. He was the first ever user of the notation software Sibelius, having tested it extensively before it was released, and engraved the first score published using Sibelius: Antara by George Benjamin (published by Faber Music).

List of works
The lunar silences, the silent tide lapping... (1973) for flute, clarinet, percussion (4 players), piano and violin
Hologenesis (1978) for solo clarinet
At Once (1979) for flute (doubling alto flute), oboe (doubling oboe d'amore & cor anglais), vibraphone and piano
Snatches (1979) for flute (doubling piccolo & alto flute), oboe (doubling cor anglais), vibraphone, and piano
Skhistos (1980) for flute, oboe, vibraphone and piano
The Juniper Tree (1981) for shadow puppet theatre (or animated film) and ensemble
Helter-Skelter (1981) for flute, vibraphone and piano
Cut/Dissolve (1984) for solo percussion
...from swerve of shore to bend of bay... (1984–85) for alto flute (doubling piccolo), bass clarinet (doubling e-flat clarinet), percussion, piano, viola and cello
Flow Form (1986–87) for solo piano
Tidal Volume I (1989) for solo harpsichord
finnissys fifty (1996) for solo piano
Little Sunderings (1996) for solo piano
for piano 1 (1997) for solo piano
for piano 2 (1997) for solo piano
for piano 3 (1997) for solo piano
for piano 4 (1997) for solo piano
for piano 5 (1998) for solo piano
for guitar 1 (1998) for solo guitar
for piano 6 (1999) for solo piano
for piano 7 (1999) for solo piano
for piano 8 (1999) for solo piano
for piano 9 (1999) for solo piano
for piano 10 (1999) for solo piano
for piano 11 (1999) for solo piano
for piano 12 (1999) for solo piano
invention 1 on the name james dillon (2001) for two vibraphones
invention 2 on the name james dillon (2001) for solo vibraphone
Still/s 1 (2002) for solo cello
Still/s 22 (2002) for clarinet and piano
Still/s 14 (2003) for solo violin
for piano 13 (2000–03) for solo piano
Still/s 2 (2004) for clarinet and cello
for piano 14 (2004) for solo piano
Still/s 10 (2004) for flute and piano
Still/s 3 (2004) for violin and cello
Piano with violin (2005) for violin and piano
for piano 15 (2005) for solo piano

Recordings
Emsley: Flowforms Mikel Toms, Topologies Ensemble Metier CD MTI 92044

References
Barrett, Richard (1988): 'Richard Emsley: A View of His Music' in Tempo, New Series, No. 164, 'Modernism and Neo-Modernism' in British Music (March 1988), pp. 20–27, Cambridge University Press

External links
Composer's own website, accessed 8 February 2010
works published via Composers Edition

1951 births
Living people
20th-century classical composers
21st-century classical composers
English classical composers
People from Goole
English male classical composers
20th-century English composers
21st-century British composers
20th-century British male musicians
21st-century British male musicians